Jean Lechantre (13 February 1922 – 12 February 2015) was a Belgian-born French footballer. He played club football most notably with Lille and CO Roubaix-Tourcoing and was capped three times for France; he ended his career as a player-coach for AC Cambrai and CO Roubaix-Tourcoing.

References

Profile at French federation official site

1922 births
2015 deaths
Belgian emigrants to France
French footballers
France international footballers
Lille OSC players
Ligue 1 players
Ligue 2 players
French football managers
CO Roubaix-Tourcoing managers
CO Roubaix-Tourcoing players

Association football forwards